Anisembiidae is a family of insects in the order Embioptera, the web-spinners.  The family is divided into several subfamilies. It is the largest family of webspinners.

Its subfamilies include the following:
Anisembiinae
Aporembiinae
Chelicercinae
Chorisembiinae
Cryptembiinae
Platyembiinae
Scolembiinae

Its genera include the following:

 Anisembia Krauss, 1911
 Aporembia Ross, 2003
 Brasilembia Ross, 2003
 Bulbocerca Ross, 1940
 Chelicerca Ross, 1940
 Chorisembia Ross, 2003
 Cryptembia Ross, 2003
 Dactylocerca Ross, 1940
 Ectyphocerca Ross, 2003
 Exochosembia Ross, 2003
 Glyphembia Ross, 2003
 Isosembia Ross, 2003
 Mesembia Ross, 1940
 Microembia Ross, 1944
 Oncosembia Ross, 2003
 Pelorembia Ross, 1984
 Phallosembia Ross, 2003
 Platyembia Ross, 2003
 Pogonembia Ross, 2003
 Saussurembia Davis, 1940
 Schizembia Ross, 1944
 Scolembia Ross, 2003
 † Poinarembia Ross, 2003
 † Stenembia Ross, 1972

References

Further reading

External links

Embioptera
Insect families